Umohoite is a rare oxide and hydroxide mineral. The name of this mineral reflects its composition: uranyl (U), molybdate (Mo) and water (H2O). Its chemical formula is (UO2)MoO4·2H2O. 

Umohoide's type location is in Marysvale, the mineral was first described by Paul F. Kerr and G. P. Brophy in 1953.

References

Uranium minerals